Phrontis  is a genus of sea snails, marine gastropod mollusks in the subfamily Nassariinae of the family Nassariidae, the Nassa mud snails or dog whelks.

Species
Species within the genus Phrontis  include:
 Phrontis alba (Say, 1826)
 Phrontis antillara (d'Orbigny, 1847)
 Phrontis candidissima (C. B. Adams, 1845)
 Phrontis complanata (Powys, 1835)
 Phrontis hotessieriana (d'Orbigny, 1842)
 Phrontis karinae (Nowell-Usticke, 1971)
 Phrontis luteostoma (Broderip & G. B. Sowerby I, 1829)
 Phrontis nassiformis (Lesson, 1842)
 Phrontis pagoda (Reeve, 1844)
 Phrontis polygonata (Lamarck, 1822)
 Phrontis tiarula (Kiener, 1841)
 Phrontis versicolor (C. B. Adams, 1852)
 Phrontis vibex (Say, 1822)
 Species brought into synonymy 
 Phrontis compacta (Angas, 1865): synonym of Reticunassa compacta (Angas, 1865)
 Phrontis crassus (Philippi, 1849): synonym of Nassarius semisulcatus (Hombron & Jacquinot, 1848)
 Phrontis nodicostata (A. Adams, 1852): synonym of Nassarius nodicostatus (A. Adams, 1852)
 Phrontis obockensis Jousseaume, 1888: synonym of Nassarius deshayesianus (Issel, 1866)

References

External links
 Adams, H. & Adams, A. (1853-1858). The genera of Recent Mollusca; arranged according to their organization. London, van Voorst.
 Galindo L.A., Puillandre N., Utge J., Lozouet P. & Bouchet P. (2016). The phylogeny and systematics of the Nassariidae revisited (Gastropoda, Buccinoidea). Molecular Phylogenetics and Evolution. 99: 337-353

Nassariidae
Gastropod genera